The Fiat G.46 was a military trainer developed in Italy shortly after World War II.

Design and development
The G.46 was a conventional, low-wing monoplane with tailwheel undercarriage, the main units of which retracted inwards. The pilot and instructor sat in tandem under a long canopy. The first prototype, powered by a  Alfa Romeo 115-Ibis engine, made its maiden flight on 25 June 1947.

Testing revealed excellent flying characteristics and suitability for aerobatics, and the type was ordered into production.

Apart from the 150 ordered by the Aeronautica Militare, 70 aircraft were exported, to Austria, Argentina and Syria.

Variants

G.46-1B
two-seater with Alfa Romeo 115bis engine, one prototype and initial production of 25 for the Italian Air Force.
G.46-2B
two-seater with de Havilland Gipsy Queen engine for the Argentine Air Force, 70 built with an additional 12 for the Syrian Air Force.
G.46-3B
two-seater with Alfa Romeo 115ter engine for the Italian Air Force, 25 built.
G.46-4B
two-seater with Alfa Romeo 115ter engine for the Italian Air Force, 55 built.
G.46-5B
two-seat navigation trainer (prototype only)
G.46-4A
single-seater with Alfa Romeo 115ter engine for the Italian Air Force, 35 built.

Operators

Argentine Air Force  operated 70 Fiat G.46

Austrian Air Force operated five former Italian Air Force G-46Bs.

Italian Air Force  operated 141 Fiat G.46 from 1949 until 1960

Syrian Air Force operated 12 G.46-2B aircraft.

Surviving aircraft 

 An ex-Argentine Air Force aircraft is displayed at the Museo Nacional de Aeronautica de Argentina.
 An ex-Argentine Air Force aircraft is displayed at the Plaza de los Aviadores (Aviators Square) in Ciudad Jardin Lomas del Palomar, Buenos Aires.
 A flightworthy G-46-3B which has been converted to a single-seat aircraft is on display at the Frasca Air Museum in Champaign, Illinois. The aircraft was originally in the service of the Italian air force.
 A G-46-3B is currently on display and undergoing restoration to airworthy at the Military Aviation Museum in Virginia Beach, Virginia.

Specifications (G.46-4B)

See also

References

Notes

Bibliography

External links

 G.46 restoration project
 Sounds of a G.46 during an air display

G.046
Low-wing aircraft
Single-engined tractor aircraft
1940s Italian military trainer aircraft